Yves Marie Monot, C.S.Sp. (born 29 May 1944) is the former bishop of the Roman Catholic Diocese of Ouesso in the Republic of the Congo.

He was born in Pont-l'Abbé, France. He was professed as a member of the Holy Ghost Fathers on 8 September 1963. He was ordained a priest for the Spiritans on 9 July 1972. After his ordination, he continued studies in science and theology at the Institut Catholique de Paris.

Upon the resignation of Bishop Hervé Itoua on 22 April 2006, Monot was appointed apostolic administrator of the diocese of Ouesso. He held this position until he was appointed bishop of Ouesso on 14 June 2008. Monot was consecrated bishop of the diocese on 7 September 2008 by Cardinal Ivan Dias.

References

1944 births
Living people
People from Pont-l'Abbé
Holy Ghost Fathers
21st-century Roman Catholic bishops in the Republic of the Congo
Roman Catholic bishops of Ouesso